Domizio Falangola (died 1470) was a Roman Catholic prelate who served as Archbishop of Sorrento (1442–1470).

Biography
On 17 Oct 1442, Domizio Falangola was appointed during the papacy of Pope Eugene IV as Archbishop of Sorrento.
He served as Archbishop of Sorrento until his death on 8 Jan 1470.

References

External links and additional sources
 (for Chronology of Bishops) 
 (for Chronology of Bishops)  

15th-century Italian Roman Catholic archbishops
Bishops appointed by Pope Eugene IV
1470 deaths